Nino is a children's novel written and illustrated by Valenti Angelo. It tells the story of Nino's childhood in a small Italian village at the turn of the century. First published in 1938, it was a Newbery Honor recipient in 1939.

References

1938 American novels
American children's novels
Newbery Honor-winning works
Novels set in Italy
1938 children's books